Nancy Lerner (born 1960) is an American investor, philanthropist, and billionaire.

Biography
Lerner was born to a Jewish family, the daughter of Norma (née Wolkoff) and Al Lerner.  She has one brother, Randy Lerner. She received a Bachelor of Arts from the University of Cincinnati and a Juris Doctor from the Cleveland State University College of Law at Cleveland State University. Her father was the CEO and chief executive of the MBNA Corporation, then the second largest issuer of credit cards in the world. When he died, his two children became billionaires. She established the Partnership for Families program which pays for In Vitro Fertilization for couples who are unable to afford the procedure.

Personal life
Lerner has been married three times. Her first husband was Michael Carosielli whom she divorced in 1998. In 2005, she married Elliott Fisher.  She has five children. In 2006, her daughter Emma Beck died in a go-kart accident. Lerner resides in Cleveland, Ohio.

References

American billionaires
Jewish American philanthropists
1960 births
Living people
Cleveland–Marshall College of Law alumni
Lerner family
21st-century American Jews